was a town located in Minamimuro District, Mie Prefecture, Japan.

As of 2003, the town had an estimated population of 1,674 and a density of 14.73 persons per km². The total area was 113.67 km².

On November 1, 2005, Kiwa was merged into the expanded city of Kumano and thus no longer exists as an independent municipality.

External links
 Official website of Kumano 

Dissolved municipalities of Mie Prefecture